Abraham Lincoln delivered his second inaugural address on Saturday, March 4, 1865, during his second inauguration as President of the United States. At a time when victory over secessionists in the American Civil War was within days and slavery in all of the U.S. was near an end, Lincoln did not speak of happiness, but of sadness. Some see this speech as a defense of his pragmatic approach to Reconstruction, in which he sought to avoid harsh treatment of the defeated rebels by reminding his listeners of how wrong both sides had been in imagining what lay before them when the war began four years earlier. Lincoln balanced that rejection of triumphalism, however, with recognition of the unmistakable evil of slavery. The address is inscribed, along with the Gettysburg Address, in the Lincoln Memorial.

Sources and theme
Lincoln used his second inaugural address to touch on the question of Divine providence. He wondered what God's will might have been in allowing the war to come, and why it had assumed the terrible dimensions it had taken. He endeavored to address some of these dilemmas, using allusions taken from the Bible.

Lincoln reiterates the cause of the war, slavery, in saying that "slaves constituted a peculiar and powerful interest. All knew that this interest was somehow the cause of the war."

The words "wringing their bread from the sweat of other men's faces" are an allusion to the Fall of Man in the Book of Genesis. As a result of Adam's sin, God tells Adam that henceforth "In the sweat of thy face shalt thou eat bread, till thou return unto the ground; for out of it wast thou taken: for dust thou art, and unto dust shalt thou return".

Lincoln quotes another of Jesus' sayings: "Woe unto the world because of offenses; for it must needs be that offenses come, but woe to that man by whom the offense cometh."

Lincoln suggests that the death and destruction wrought by the war was divine retribution to the U.S. for possessing slavery, saying that God may will that the war continue "until every drop of blood drawn with the lash shall be paid by another drawn with the sword", and that the war was the country's "woe due".

Lincoln's point seems to be that God's purposes are not directly knowable to humans, and represents a theme that he had expressed earlier. After Lincoln's death, his secretaries found among his papers an undated manuscript now generally known as the "Meditations on the Divine Will." In that manuscript, Lincoln wrote:

The will of God prevails—In great contests each party claims to act in accordance with the will of God. Both may be, and one must be wrong. God cannot be for, and against the same thing at the same time. In the present civil war it is quite possible that God's purpose is somewhat different from the purpose of either party—and yet the human instrumentalities, working just as they do, are of the best adaptation to effect this.

Lincoln's sense that the divine will was unknowable stood in marked contrast to sentiments popular at the time. In the popular mind, both sides of the Civil War assumed that they could read God's will and assumed His favor in their opposing causes. Julia Ward Howe's "Battle Hymn of the Republic" expressed sentiments common among the supporters of the U.S. cause, that the U.S. was waging a righteous war that served God's purposes. "Mine eyes have seen the glory of the coming of the Lord..." Similarly, the Confederacy chose Deo vindice as its motto, often translated as "God will vindicate us."  Lincoln, responding to compliments from Thurlow Weed on the speech, said that "... I believe it is not immediately popular. Men are not flattered by being shown that there has been a difference of purpose between the Almighty and them."

Inaugural speech

In popular culture
 An excerpt of the speech was dramatized in the 2012 Steven Spielberg film Lincoln, with Daniel Day-Lewis portraying Lincoln.
 An excerpt of the speech was dramatized in the two-hour 2013 National Geographic Channel political docudrama Killing Lincoln, with Billy Campbell portraying Lincoln.
American composer Vincent Persichetti used text from the speech for his work A Lincoln Address that had been scheduled for President Richard Nixon's inaugural concert January 19, 1973, but was removed from the program after someone in the administration read the text and decided the President would be embarrassed by the excerpt "Fondly do we hope ... that this mighty scourge of war may speedily pass away." Ironically, four days later, the Vietnam Peace Accords were signed.

See also
 Lincoln's first inaugural address

References

Further reading
 
 
 
 
 Schaub, Diana (2021). His Greatest Speeches: How Lincoln Moved the Nation. St. Martin's Press.

External links

 Abraham Lincoln's Second Inaugural Address Excerpt, Written and Signed in His Own Hand, Part 1 "Both Parties" Shapell Manuscript Foundation
 Abraham Lincoln's Second Inaugural Address Excerpt, Written and Signed in His Own Hand, Part 2 "With Malice" Shapell Manuscript Foundation
 U.S. Library of Congress website on Lincoln's second inauguration
 The Second Inaugural Address (1865) – Restoring the Union EDSITEment lesson plan
 Reenactment of the Second Inaugural Address at C-SPAN
 Avalon Project text of address

1865 in American politics
1865 speeches
Inaugural address 2
Inaugural address 2
Lincoln, Abraham, 2
1865 in Washington, D.C.
March 1865 events